The state of a regenerating limb while partially completed.

Swidler can refer to :

Leonard Swidler (1929-) is an American theologian. 
Swidler Berlin Shereff Friedman LLP was a Washington, D.C.-based law firm.
Swidler & Berlin v. United States was a case in which the Supreme Court of the United States held that the death of an attorney's client does not terminate the attorney-client privilege.